Gurdwara Chowa Sahib (literally: "Gurudwara of the exalted spring") is a renovated gurudwara located at the northern edge of the Rohtas Fort, near Jhelum, Pakistan. Situated near the fort's Talaqi gate, the gurdwara commemorates the site where Guru Nanak is popularly believed to have created a water-spring during one of his journeys known as udasi.But parkash of guru granth sahib is not there.

History
The first commemorative structure was built by Charat Singh, who installed a sarovar pool, and area for recitation of the Guru Granth Sahib. The current building dates from 1834, and was commissioned by Maharaja Ranjit Singh.

Significance
Sikhs believe that Guru Nanak and Bhai Mardana were traveling in the region during the fourth of Guru Nanak's journeys - known as udasis. The two were traveling during the summer, and had arrived at the site following a 40-day stay at the nearby Tilla Jogian temples.  Bhai Mardana expressed his thirst while lamenting that water was scarce in the region during that time of year. Guru Nanak is said to have then struck the earth with his cane and moved a stone, thereby revealing a natural spring.

Sikh lore states that Sher Shah Suri attempted to shift the spring up the hill to use a source of water for the newly constructed Rohtas Fort. The king's engineers attempted the feat three times, failing each time.

Conservation

The temple stands at the base of a hill upon which the Rohtas Fort, a UNESCO World Heritage Site, is situated. 

In 2020, a Sikh community organization based in USA, Ranjit Nagara, took over the rehabilitation and renovation of the Gurdwara. The work is being done through international funding via a multicultural team to bring the Gurdwara back to its original form and function as well as adding new facilities.

See also
 Sikhism

References

Gurdwaras in Pakistan
Religious buildings and structures in Punjab, Pakistan
Domes
Guru Nanak Dev
19th-century gurdwaras